Kim Hyun-sook (born October 16, 1978) is a South Korean actress and comedian. She is best known for playing the title character in Ugly Miss Young-ae, a long-running sitcom that depicts the reality of life as a single, older woman in Korea.

Filmography

Television series

Web series

Film

Variety show

Theater

Awards and nominations

References

External links
 
 
 
 

1978 births
Living people
South Korean television actresses
South Korean film actresses
South Korean stage actresses
South Korean musical theatre actresses
Kyungsung University alumni